KWJD-LP was a television station in Van Nuys, California, licensed to broadcast locally on UHF channel 25. Founded May 21, 1998, the station was owned by Friendly Broadcasting Company. The station's license was cancelled by the Federal Communications Commission on March 16, 2015.

External links 

Statement regarding the proceeding of KWJD-LP (PDF)

WJD-LP
Defunct television stations in the United States
Defunct companies based in California
Television channels and stations established in 1998
Television channels and stations disestablished in 2015
WJD-LP
1998 establishments in California
2015 disestablishments in California